Andrea Bakula (born 15 August 1981 in Zagreb) is a Croatian table tennis player.

She competed at the 2008 Summer Olympics, reaching the first round of the singles competition. She also competed in the team competition.

She was born in Zagreb, and resides there.

References

External links
 
 

1981 births
Living people
Croatian female table tennis players
Table tennis players at the 2000 Summer Olympics
Table tennis players at the 2008 Summer Olympics
Olympic table tennis players of Croatia
Sportspeople from Zagreb